Pyrgota fenestrata is a species of fly in the family Pyrgotidae. It is found in the Southeastern United States.

References

Pyrgotidae
Articles created by Qbugbot
Insects described in 1851
Tephritoidea genera